Sahel-Benin Union was a short-lived union of four former French colonies of French West Africa, that were the four Republics of Upper Volta (Burkina Faso), Niger, Dahomey (Benin) and Côte d’Ivoire.

This union "was the grouping that worked in the most efficient way for the cause of African unity. This union [...] was provided with modest but functional institutions; a Council seating with the Chiefs of States, the ministers of common affairs and the presidents of the National Assemblies [Assemblées Nationales]. A customs union was set up as well as sinking fund. A political, economic and military coordination developed.". Nevertheless, it lasted only for a short time and was replaced by May 1959 far more modestly by the Conseil de l'Entente.

See also 
 Conseil de l'Entente
 French West Africa
 Economy of Africa
 Economic community
 International organization
 Mali Federation

Notes and references 

1958 in the Republic of Dahomey
1958 in Upper Volta
1958 in Ivory Coast
1958 in Niger
1959 in the Republic of Dahomey
1959 in Upper Volta
1959 in Ivory Coast
1959 in Niger
Pan-Africanism in Africa
Pan-Africanism in Burkina Faso